UEO may refer to:

Katsuhiro Ueo (born 1972), Japanese professional drifting driver
Kumejima Airport (IATA: UEO), Okinawa, Japan
United Earth Oceans Organization, an organization in the television series SeaQuest DSV
the abbreviation for Union de l'Europe Occidentale on the flag of the Western European Union